"Rabbit in Your Headlights" is a song by British electronic duo Unkle. It was released as the lead single from their debut album Psyence Fiction (1998). The song features vocals from Radiohead singer Thom Yorke. 

The song was written by Yorke and Unkle member Josh Davis and produced by Unkle, the track heavily uses samples from other songs. "Rabbit in Your Headlights" combines Yorke's vocals with a variety of samples from sources ranging from Dutch band Supersister to the film Contact (1997). It takes its title from a quote from the thriller film Jacob's Ladder (1990); dialogue from the film is also one of many samples on the song. The song also appears to sample the percussion from Talk Talk's "New Grass" from their album Laughing Stock (1991).

While the single was not a commercial success, it was positively received by critics. Pitchfork credited "Rabbit in Your Headlights" as a "turning point" for Yorke, placing his vocals in the context of experimental electronic music for the first time and foreshadowing Radiohead's 2000 album Kid A.

The music video, directed by Jonathan Glazer and starring actor Denis Lavant, was acclaimed for its direction and cinematography, and won numerous awards.

Music video

The music video, directed by Jonathan Glazer, premiered in November 1998. Glazer said he saw it as a companion to his music video for the 1997 Radiohead single "Karma Police".

The video won the MVPA's Best International Video of the Year Award in 1999. In 2006, Stylus Magazine ranked it number one on their list of the Top 100 Music Videos of All Time. It is anthologised on the DVD Directors Label, Vol. 5: The Work of Director Jonathan Glazer.

The video uses a technique which Glazer later used for the "A Song for the Lovers" video, being shot in real-time and allowing the diegetic sounds produced by objects and characters to be audible above the music. The music itself is non-diegetic.

Plot

The video stars Denis Lavant as a man wearing a heavy parka and walking along the middle of the road in a busy car tunnel. He appears to be disoriented, mumbling and shouting incoherences, only occasionally including intelligible words such as "Cristo", "Allahu Akbar", and "sinner!" Some of the cars honk at him and swerve out of his way. All of a sudden a car hits him from the side, and he is left on the ground. The car continues its course without stopping or slowing down. After a while, the man stands up and starts walking again as if nothing had happened. Then another car hits him; this time the hit occurs straight on and sends him flying a couple of feet. A passing motorist watches with contempt as the man rolls in the street. The man gets up again. A car swerves by and slows down alongside the man, occupied by three young men played by British actor Craig Kelly as the vehicle's driver and UNKLE's James Lavelle and Richard File as passengers. The driver repeatedly inquires as to the man's destination, who for his part seems oblivious to their presence and continues along his way blurting, "Saint Christopher"; the driver soon tires of this and speeds off whilst calling out, "Nice coat, man!" Another car hits the man, and he gets up almost instantly. More accidents occur, some cars honk, some cars swerve out of the way — but none stop.

The man removes his parka and throws it on the ground. He is shirtless underneath, and we see his chest covered with bruises and cuts. After the ritornello, leaving just a piano and drums playing, the man stops as well. He smiles and opens his arms in a crucifix-like position. A car is coming his way and makes no intention of stopping. The car hits the man, but this time he stands unmoved, and the car is destroyed upon impact.

Track listing
 "Rabbit in Your Headlights" – 6:18
 "Rabbit in Your Headlights (Instrumental)" – 6:00
 "Rabbit in Your Headlights (Underdog Mix)" – 4:46
 "Rabbit in Your Headlights (Underdog Instrumental)" – 4:31
 "Rabbit in Your Headlights (3D Mix - Reverse Light)" – 7:32
 "Rabbit in Your Headlights (3D Mix - Reverse Light Instrumental)" – 7:32
 "Rabbit in Your Headlights (Suburban Hell Remix)" – 6:07
 "Rabbit in Your Headlights" (DJ Shadow and James Lavelle [UNKLE] featuring Thom Yorke) -- 5:02

References

External links
Music video profile on mvdbase.com

1998 singles
Unkle songs
Songs written by Thom Yorke